The Search or Soul Searching is a 2009 Tibetan romance film written and directed by Pema Tseden. The Search is the first-ever film made in Western China's Tibet Autonomous Region to have been shot entirely with a Tibetan crew and in the Tibetan language. The film picks up the story of a photographer and a director travels from village to village looking for actors to star in a film based on the Tibetan opera Drimé Kunden, a legendary account of a prince who selflessly gives away his children and his own eyes to those in need. The film premiered at Locarno International Film Festival on August 11, 2009. The Search won Special Jury Award at the 12th Shanghai International Film Festival and was nominated for Golden Goblet.

Plot
A boss leads a director and a photographer to Tibet to look for an actor to star in a film based on the Tibetan opera Drimé Kunden, a legendary account of a prince who selflessly gives away his children and his own eyes to those in need. In order to find a suitable actor, they visits many Tibetan villages, towns and Townships, and monasteries. In a Tibetan village, director chose a girl who played Drimé Kunden's concubine, but the girl has covered her face, and she doesn't want anyone to see her face. The girl asks to follow them to find her former boyfriend, the director answers her request. Along the way, the boss tells the story of his first love. At last, the girl leaves her former boyfriend. The film crew continues to search for a suitable actor.

Cast
 Zong Zhi
 Manla Jiepu
 Dobe Dorje
 Drolma Gyab
 Lumo Tso

Production
This film was shot in Qinghai-Tibet Plateau.

Accolades

References

External links
 
 

2009 films
Chinese romantic drama films
Tibetan-language films
Films shot in Qinghai
Films set in Qinghai
Films about Tibet
Films directed by Pema Tseden